Alexandre N'Gadi Kakou (born 28 November 1990) is a French professional footballer who plays as a midfielder for Championnat National 3 club Bayonne.

Career
N'Gadi began his career at Toulouse, where he made two senior appearances; one in Ligue 1 and one in the Europa League. Since leaving Toulouse in 2010, he has spent his career in the lower reaches of the French leagues, representing among others Balma, Tarbes and Pau.

Career statistics
.

References
 Alexandre N'Gadi Kakou at foot-national.com
 
 
 

1990 births
Living people
People from L'Union
Sportspeople from Haute-Garonne
French footballers
Association football midfielders
Toulouse FC players
Balma SC players
Tarbes Pyrénées Football players
Pau FC players
Genêts Anglet players
Aviron Bayonnais players
Ligue 1 players
Championnat National 2 players
Championnat National 3 players
Footballers from Occitania (administrative region)